The 2007–08 Serbian League Belgrade was the fourth season of the league under its current title. It began in August 2007 and ended in June 2008.

League table

Playoffs

External links
 Football Association of Serbia
 Football Association of Belgrade

Serbian League Belgrade seasons
3
Serb